Mata da Serreta is a landmark in the Azores. It is located in Angra do Heroísmo, on the island of Terceira.

Angra do Heroísmo